A record-breaking large and destructive tornado outbreak impacted the Southern United States at the end of November 2004. The outbreak started with numerous weak tornadoes from Central Texas through Louisiana from November 22 through the afternoon of November 23 before more significant tornadoes occurred through November 24. Over a dozen intense tornadoes touched down, including four deadly tornadoes in Texas, Louisiana, Mississippi, and Alabama. Overall, 104 tornadoes were confirmed, setting the record for the largest continuous outbreak in November.

Meteorological synopsis
In November and December 2004, the prevailing pattern was conducive for severe weather across the Southern United States, with a large ridge over the northern Pacific Ocean supporting a southerly storm track toward the Gulf Coast. The fall season contributed to an already active year, solidifying 2004 as the busiest year for tornadoes on record in the United States.

This particular tornado outbreak began on November 22 as a potent cold-core low over Southern California began to move eastward toward Texas, where the Storm Prediction Center (SPC) issued a Slight risk of severe weather. At the surface, a warm front became increasingly defined stretching from Central Louisiana westward through Central Texas. To the south of this boundary, a weakening capping inversion, dewpoints reaching the lower 70s °F, and mixed layer convective available potential energy upwards of 1,500 J/kg indicated an environment supportive of damaging winds and isolated tornadoes. Series of strong to severe thunderstorms developed along this boundary, including a persistent supercell near the Houston metropolitan area. Low-level wind shear was locally enhanced along this front, allowing the storms to produce brief tornadoes as they interacted with it throughout the afternoon.

On November 23, the cold-core low and associated mid- to upper-level winds of  shifted eastward from the Texas Panhandle toward the Mississippi River Valley. With a low-pressure area forming over North Texas and advancing toward Arkansas, the warm front began the day just inland from the northwestern Gulf Coast but soon began to lift northward. South of this boundary, MLCAPE values of 2,000-2,500 J/kg were prevalent, while initially weak shear profiles improved as the upper-level disturbance approached from the west. By the afternoon hours, tornadic supercells developed north of I-10 before spreading eastward into Louisiana and Mississippi with time. Trailing this activity, an intense squall line developed across coastal sections of Texas and progressed eastward with increasing damaging wind potential. Even as this line overtook previously discrete supercells, additional ones developed across Mississippi and Alabama through the morning hours. Finally, as convection spread eastward into Georgia and the Carolinas, the combination of continued strong shear but marginal instability caused the event to transition to more of a damaging wind episode.

Complimenting the Moderate risk that shifted eastward into Alabama, Georgia, and the Florida Panhandle early on November 24, the SPC issued another Moderate risk for a secondary threat of severe weather farther north. Here, the deepening surface low supported an arced warm front across Indiana, Ohio, and Kentucky. In the presence of strong wind shear and MLCAPE values of 500-800 J/kg, bands of convection developed across the region, particularly focused along a pre-frontal trough. Tornadic supercells tracked across southeastern Indiana toward the Ohio border over ensuing hours. By the evening, these storms were undercut by a surging cold front, and loss of daytime heating eroded the instability necessary for severe storms to continue.

Confirmed tornadoes

November 22 event

November 23 event

November 24 event

See also

List of North American tornadoes and tornado outbreaks
November 1992 tornado outbreak

Notes

References

2004 meteorology
F3 tornadoes
Tornadoes in Texas
Tornadoes in Louisiana
Tornadoes in Arkansas
Tornadoes in Alabama
Tornadoes in Mississippi
Tornadoes in Florida
Tornadoes in South Carolina
Tornadoes in Indiana
November 22-24
2004 natural disasters in the United States
November 2004 events in the United States